Spade Independent School District was a public school district based in the community of Spade, Texas (USA).

The district had one school, Spade School, that served students in grades pre-kindergarten through twelve.

History
On July 1, 2006, Spade ISD merged with Olton Independent School District to form Olton ISD .

External links
 
 Map of Lamb County showing area school districts prior to SISD consolidation - Texas Education Agency - Web version

School districts in Lamb County, Texas
Former school districts in Texas
School districts disestablished in 2006
2006 disestablishments in Texas